The 2018 Engie Open Saint-Gaudens Occitanie was a professional tennis tournament played on outdoor clay courts. It was the twenty-second edition of the tournament and was part of the 2018 ITF Women's Circuit. It took place in Saint-Gaudens, France, on 14–20 May 2018.

Singles main draw entrants

Seeds 

 1 Rankings as of 7 May 2018.

Other entrants 
The following players received a wildcard into the singles main draw:
  Tessah Andrianjafitrimo
  Manon Arcangioli
  Eden Silva
  Margot Yerolymos

The following player received entry using a protected ranking:
  Quirine Lemoine

The following players received entry from the qualifying draw:
  Kimberly Birrell
  Priscilla Heise
  Yana Sizikova
  Harmony Tan

Champions

Singles

 Vera Lapko def.  Quirine Lemoine, 6–2, 6–4

Doubles
 
 Naiktha Bains /  Francesca Di Lorenzo def.  Manon Arcangioli /  Shérazad Reix, 6–4, 1–6, [11–9]

External links 
 Official website 
 2018 Engie Open Saint-Gaudens Occitanie at ITFtennis.com

2018 ITF Women's Circuit
2018 in French tennis
Open Saint-Gaudens Occitanie